= Shivanapur =

Coordinates: 13°09′N 77°54′E

- Village
- Interactive map of Shivanapur
- Country: India
- State: Karnataka
- District: Dharwad

Government
  - Body: Village Panchayat

Population (2011)
  - Total: 740

Languages
  - Official: Kannada
- Time zone: UTC+5:30 (IST)
- ISO 3166 code: IN-KA
- Vehicle registration: KA
- Website: karnataka.gov.in

Shivanapur is a village in Dharwad district of Karnataka, India.

== Demographics ==
As of the 2011 Census of India there were 138 households in Shivanapur and a total population of 740 consisting of 384 males and 356 females. There were 125 children ages 0–6.
